Christopher Cross is the debut album by singer-songwriter Christopher Cross, released in December 1979. Recorded in mid-1979, the album was one of the early digitally recorded albums, utilizing the 3M Digital Recording System.

Cited as one of the most influential soft rock albums of the late 1970s and early 1980s, it won five Grammy Awards, including Album of the Year, Record of the Year, Song of the Year, and Best New Artist, with Cross becoming the first artist to win the four major categories in the same year — a feat not replicated until Norah Jones in 2003.

Reception 
According to Stephen Thomas Erlewine, the album was "a huge hit and widely acclaimed, at least among industry professionals (critics didn't give it a second listen), leading to multi-platinum success and Grammys." In his retrospective review for AllMusic, Erlewine says that while its success as a soft rock album has little cachet with most listeners, it "remains one of the best mainstream albums of its time" because of consistent song quality and Cross's skillful musicianship: "Yes, he does favor sentimentality and can be very sweet on the ballads, but his melodicism is rich and construction tight, so there's a sturdy foundation for the classy professional gloss provided by his studio pros and friends, including indelible backing vocals by Michael McDonald."

In retrospective appraisals, Christopher Cross is regarded as a key release of yacht rock music. For Spin in 2009, Chuck Eddy lists it among the genre's eight essential albums. Vinyl Me, Please magazine's Timothy Malcolm includes it in his 2017 list of the 10 best yacht rock albums, explaining that, "It’s actually a sonic outlier for the yacht rock genre, heavy on acoustic guitar and strings. But its message fits the genre (a fool searching for inner peace), and yeah, it’s still undeniably smooth." For The Vinyl District's online publication in 2018, Michael H. Little calls it the genre's best album as well as one of its smoothest, crediting it for making Cross "the face of soft rock".

Track listing
All tracks composed by Christopher Cross.

"Say You'll Be Mine" – 2:53
"I Really Don't Know Anymore" – 3:49
"Spinning" (Duet with Valerie Carter) – 3:59
"Never Be the Same" – 4:40
"Poor Shirley" – 4:20
"Ride Like the Wind" – 4:32
"The Light Is On" – 4:07
"Sailing" – 4:14
"Minstrel Gigolo" – 6:00
"Mary Ann" (Bonus Track On The 2012 Japanese Remastered CD) – 2:52

'Mary Ann' was originally written for the YAMAHA World Music Festival in Japan and released in 1980 as a Japan only single.

Personnel 

 Christopher Cross – lead vocals, electric guitar, acoustic guitar (1, 4, 6-9), backing vocals (1, 5-8), guitar solo (5, 6)
 Michael Omartian – acoustic piano (1-4, 6, 7, 8), synthesizers (9), backing vocals (9)
 Rob Meurer – synthesizers (2-4, 6-8), electric piano (3, 4, 7, 8), celesta (3), acoustic piano (5, 9), organ (5)
 Jay Graydon – guitar solo (1, 4)
 Larry Carlton – guitar solo (2, 7)
 Eric Johnson – guitar solo (9)
 Andy Salmon – bass
 Tommy Taylor – drums
 Lenny Castro – percussion (1, 2, 4-7, 9)
 Victor Feldman – vibraphone (3, 4), percussion (3, 7, 8)
 Jim Horn – saxophone (2, 6)
 Jackie Kelso – saxophone (2, 6)
 Don Roberts – saxophone (2, 6)
 Tomás Ramírez – sax solo (9)
 Lew McCreary – trombone (2, 6)
 Chuck Findley – trumpet (2, 6), flugelhorn (3)
 Assa Drori – concertmaster (3, 5, 6, 8)
 Nicolette Larson – backing vocals (1)
 Michael McDonald – backing vocals (2, 6)
 Valerie Carter – lead and backing vocals (3)
 Myrna Matthews – backing vocals (4)
 Marty McCall – backing vocals (4)
 Stormie Omartian – backing vocals (4)
 Don Henley – backing vocals (7)
 J.D. Souther – backing vocals (7)

Production 
 Producer – Michael Omartian
 Assistant Producer – Michael Ostin
 Engineer and Mixing  – Chet Himes
 Second Engineer – Stuart Gitlin
 Mastering – Bobby Hata
 Artwork – Danny Henderson and James Flournoy Holmes
 Design – James Flournoy Holmes and Wonder Graphics
 Flamingo Concept – Jim Newhouse

Charts

Weekly charts

Year-end charts

Certifications

Accolades
Cross, the album and the hit "Sailing" won the following Grammy Awards:

References

External links
The 45 version of "Sailing" on YouTube
"Ride Like The Wind" Promo Video
Album playlist

Christopher Cross albums
1979 debut albums
Grammy Award for Album of the Year
Albums produced by Michael Omartian
Warner Records albums